Herbert Joos (21 March 1940 – 7 December 2019) was a German jazz trumpeter, flugelhornist, and graphic designer. He made recordings solo and in groups, especially with the Vienna Art Orchestra. In 2017, he received the Jazzpreis Baden-Württemberg for his life's work.

Life and works 
Born in Karlsruhe, Joos learned trumpet first by self-study and then by a private teacher. He studied double bass from 1958, but then turned to flugelhorn, baritone horn, mellophone, and alphorn. Since the mid-1960s, he has been a member of Modern Jazz quintet Karlsruhe, from which the group Fourmenonly was created (with Wilfried Eichhorn and ). He also led his own wind trio, quartet and orchestra. He achieved more recognition in the 1980s as a member of the Vienna Art Orchestra, which he influenced. Since the 1990s he has participated in the SüdPool project. He also played with the Orchestre National de France.

Instead of a speech after the laudations, he thanked in a short phrase, and played a concert with an orchestra of 16. He also produced drawings, book illustrations and paintings.

Herbert Joos died on 7 December 2019 after surgery in a Baden-Baden hospital.

Discography 
Joos left  as soloist, in small groups and with orchestras, especially recordings with the Vienna Art Orchestra in the 1980s.

Solo
 The Philosophy of the Fluegelhorn

Group
 Daybreak - The Dark Side Of Twilight (1977)
 Cracked Mirrors / Harry Pepl, Herbert Joos, Jon Christensen (1988)
 Orchestra / Eberhard Weber (1989)

With Vienna Art Orchestra
Tango from Obango (Art, 1980)
Concerto Piccolo (Hat ART, 1981)
Suite for the Green Eighties (Hat ART, 1982)
From No Time to Rag Time (Hat ART, 1983)
A Notion in Perpetual Motion (Hat ART, 1985)

References

External links 

 
 
 Herbert Joos kind-of-blue.de

1940 births
2019 deaths
German jazz trumpeters
Male trumpeters
German jazz composers
Male jazz composers
German printmakers
21st-century trumpeters
21st-century German male musicians
Vienna Art Orchestra members
Musicians from Karlsruhe